Virve Roolaid (later Põldsam, born 2 November 1933) is a retired Estonian javelin thrower. In 1954 she won a gold medal at the World Student Games, placed second at the European championships, and was ranked second in the world with a throw of 54.89 m.

Roolaid took up athletics in 1951 and won seven Estonian javelin titles, in 1952, 1957, 1960, 1961, 1963, 1965 and 1970. She also competed in the discus throw and shot put.

References

1933 births
Living people
Estonian female javelin throwers
European Athletics Championships medalists